The Natural is the third solo studio album by American rapper Haystak. It was released on July 23, 2002 through Koch Records. Recording sessions took place at Street Flavor Recording Studios in Nashville, Tennessee. Production was handled by Kevin "DJ Dev" Grisham, Sonny Paradise, Shannon Sanders and Dale Babb. It features guest appearances from Quanie Cash, Dale Babb, Bubba Sparxxx, Raw One & Squeeky Clean.

The album peaked at number 164 on the Billboard 200 albums chart and at #31 on the Top R&B/Hip-Hop Albums chart in the United States, making it Haystak's first charted project.

Its sequel, The Natural II, was released on May 12, 2009 via Real Talk Entertainment.

Track listing

Personnel
Jason Winfree – main artist
Dale "Eyes Havoc" Babb – vocals (track 4), backing vocals (track 16), producer (tracks: 4, 13, 16)
Quanie Cash – vocals (track 8)
Squeeky Clean – vocals (track 11)
Raw One – vocals (track 11)
Warren Anderson Mathis – vocals (track 18)
Dutch The Great – vocals (track 18)
Lexx Luger – vocals (track 18)
Sonny Paradise – backing vocals (tracks: 5, 15), producer (tracks: 2-9, 11-17), executive producer
David Davidson – strings (tracks: 6, 13)
Andrew Ramsey – guitar (track 13)
Kevin "DJ Dev" Grisham – producer (tracks: 2-9, 11-17), executive producer
Shannon Sanders – producer (tracks: 2, 8, 9, 11, 14)
Mark Linger – mixing
Erik Wolf – mastering
Jeff Gilligan – art direction & design

Chart history

References

2002 albums
Haystak albums
E1 Music albums